Tripoli was the first modern torpedo cruiser built for the Italian Regia Marina (Royal Navy). She was built by the Regio Cantiere di Castellammare di Stabia shipyard in 1885–86. Tripoli spent her career in the main Italian fleet, where she was occupied primarily with peacetime training exercises. She was modernized several times throughout her career, and in 1910, was converted into a minelayer, a role she served in for another thirteen years, including during World War I. She was the longest serving torpedo cruiser in the Italian fleet, with over 36 years in service by the time she was discarded in March 1923.

Design

Tripoli was the first modern torpedo cruiser built by the Regia Marina; she followed the earlier cruiser , which had been a failed design that did not see much use. The design for Tripoli was prepared by Engineering Inspector Benedetto Brin.

Characteristics

The ship was originally fitted with two pole masts with a light rigging, though the masts were later cut down. She had a crew of between 105 and 111.

Her propulsion system consisted of three double-expansion steam engines, each driving a single screw propeller; she was the first Italian warship to be fitted with a triple-shaft propulsion system. Steam was supplied by six coal-fired locomotive boilers that were trunked into two funnels.

The primary armament for Tripoli was five  torpedo tubes. Two tubes were mounted in the bow and the other three were mounted in trainable deck launchers, one at the stern and two amidships. She was also equipped with one  32-caliber (cal.) gun for use against enemy counterparts. Defense against torpedo boats was provided by a secondary battery of six  43-cal. guns, two  20-cal. guns, and three 37 mm revolving Hotchkiss guns, all mounted singly. In 1904, the ship was rearmed with a single  40-cal. gun, six 57 mm 40-cal. guns, one  40-cal. gun; two of the torpedo tubes were removed. In 1910, Tripoli was converted into a minelayer; the remaining torpedo tubes were removed and equipment to handle 64 mines was installed. A second 3 in gun was added and all of the light guns were removed with the exception of four of the 57 mm guns.

Service history
The keel for Tripoli was laid down at the Regio Cantiere di Castellammare di Stabia shipyard on 10 June 1885. Work proceeded quickly, and she was launched on 25 August 1886, and fitting out was completed by 1 December that year. The ship took part in the annual fleet maneuvers of 1887, which began on 10 June 1887. The first half of the maneuvers tested the ability to attack and defend the Strait of Messina, and concluded in time for a fleet review by King Umberto I on the 21st. The second phase consisted of joint maneuvers with the Italian Army; Tripoli and the torpedo cruiser  were tasked with blockading Livorno. The exercises lasted until 30 July. The maneuvers consisted of close-order drills and a simulated attack on and defense of La Spezia. Later that year, the ship was present during a naval review held for the German Kaiser Wilhelm II during a visit to Italy.

Tripoli was assigned to the 2nd Division of the Active Squadron, along with the ironclad , the protected cruiser , and four torpedo boats. In 1895, Tripoli was stationed in the 2nd Maritime Department, split between Taranto and  Naples, along with most of the torpedo cruisers in the Italian fleet. These included the four Goito and the eight Partenope-class cruisers.

Tripoli was taken out of service in 1897–1898 to be modernized. She was re-boilered with new water-tube boilers manufactured by the German firm Schichau-Werke, a new bow with a higher forecastle was fitted, and her masts were cut down. In 1910, Tripoli was converted into a minelayer, with capacity for 64 naval mines. At the outbreak of the Italo-Turkish War in September 1911, Goito was stationed in Venice along with Tripoli and Montebello. None of the vessels saw action during the war.

Italy had declared neutrality at the start of World War I, but by July 1915, the Triple Entente had convinced the Italians to enter the war against the Central Powers. Admiral Paolo Thaon di Revel, the Italian naval chief of staff, believed that the threat from Austro-Hungarian submarines and naval mines in the narrow waters of the Adriatic was too serious for him to use the fleet in an active way. Instead, Revel decided to implement a blockade at the relatively safer southern end of the Adriatic with the main fleet, while smaller vessels, such as the MAS boats, conducted raids on Austro-Hungarian ships and installations. She continued to serve as a minelayer during the war in support of Revel's strategy. She was officially reclassified as a minelayer on 1 July 1921, though she did not remain in service for very long, being stricken from the naval register on 4 March 1923 and thereafter broken up for scrap. At the time of her disposal, Tripoli was the last torpedo cruiser still in the Italian fleet's inventory, surpassing even the Agordat class, which had been built fifteen years after Tripoli entered service.

Notes

References
 
 
 
 
 
 
 
 
 
 
 
 

Cruisers of the Regia Marina
1886 ships